The Ernest Gruening Cabin is a historic rural cabin in Juneau, Alaska, United States, and the centerpiece of Ernest Gruening State Historical Park. It is the only building associated with the life of Ernest Gruening, governor of the Alaska Territory 1939–53, other than the Alaska Governor's Mansion. The cabin was built on land Gruening leased (and later purchased) from the United States Forest Service, and was built by local laborers including Gruening's son Hunt. Its exterior is finished in shiplap siding milled to resemble unfinished logs. The interior consists of a single large chamber, with a circular stairway leading to a sleeping loft above. The kitchen area is set apart from the rest of the space by different flooring, an alteration by Gruening's grandson. The property is now a state historic site.

The cabin was listed on the National Register of Historic Places in 1992.

See also
National Register of Historic Places listings in Juneau, Alaska

References

External links

 Ernest Gruening State Historical Park

1947 establishments in Alaska
Houses completed in 1947
Houses in Juneau, Alaska
Houses on the National Register of Historic Places in Alaska
Buildings and structures on the National Register of Historic Places in Juneau, Alaska